Callerinnys is a genus of moths in the family Geometridae described by Warren in 1894.

Species
Callerinnys combusta Warren, 1893  (from India)
Callerinnys fuscomarginata Warren, 1893 (from India)
Callerinnys obliquilinea  Moore, 1888 (from India)

References

Ennominae